Georges River was an electoral district of the Legislative Assembly in the Australian state of New South Wales from 1930 to 2007. It was replaced by Oatley.

Members for Georges River

Election results

References

Former electoral districts of New South Wales
1930 establishments in Australia
2007 disestablishments in Australia
Constituencies established in 1930
Constituencies disestablished in 2007